Donner is a lunar impact crater on the far side of the Moon. It is located just to the northeast of the Mare Australe, behind the southeastern limb of the Moon. During favorable librations this part of the lunar surface can be brought into view of the Earth, but the site is viewed from the edge and so not much detail can be seen.

This crater has a moderately eroded outer rim, and several small and tiny craterlets lie along the edge. A joined pair of small craters lie across the southern rim and inner wall. An unnamed, crater-like feature with about the same diameter as Donner is attached to the northern outer rim. The structure along the inner wall has been softened and rounded by a long history of minor impacts.

The interior floor is relatively level, and is pock-marked by multiple tiny craterlets. There is a curving ridge in the southern part of the floor that is attached to the inner wall, and possibly forms the remnant of a small crater rim.

Satellite craters
By convention these features are identified on lunar maps by placing the letter on the side of the crater midpoint that is closest to Donner.

References

 
 
 
 
 
 
 
 
 
 
 
 

Impact craters on the Moon